Stag Harbour is a designated place in the Canadian province of Newfoundland and Labrador. It is on Fogo Island within the Town of Fogo Island.

Geography 
Stag Harbour is in Newfoundland on Fogo Island within Division No. 8.

Demographics 

See also 
List of communities in Newfoundland and Labrador
List of designated places in Newfoundland and Labrador

References 

Populated coastal places in Canada
Designated places in Newfoundland and Labrador